Philip Simmons High School is a high school in Charleston, South Carolina, United States. It is part of the Berkeley County School District, and is named after Philip Simmons.

Opened in 2017, it serves Daniel Island, an area of Charleston; Thomas Island; and the Cainhoy Peninsula. These areas were previously zoned to Hanahan High School.

Its campus has  of land, and the school building will have  of space.

Chris Buchholz is the principal.|url=https://www.bcsdschools.net/Page/33420 |accessdate=23 August 2020 |language=en}}</ref>

History
The school officially opened on August 17, 2017. Dr. James A. Spencer was the first principal, and Brion Packett was the first assistant principal for athletics. Prior to his appointment, Spencer was the principal of Marrington Middle School of the Arts.

Feeder patterns
Its feeder schools are Daniel Island K-8, Cainhoy Elementary, Philip Simmons Elementary, and Philip Simmons Middle.

References

External links
 Philip Simmons High School
 Philip Simmons High School - BCSD Capital projects
 New Philip Simmons High School - RMF Engineering

Public high schools in South Carolina
Schools in Berkeley County, South Carolina
2017 establishments in South Carolina
Education in Charleston, South Carolina
Educational institutions established in 2017